Niboshi (煮干し), often called iriko (炒り子) in Western Japan, are Japanese small dried fish. They are one of many varieties of small dried fish used throughout Asia in snacks and as seasoning for soup stocks and other foods.
The type of fish used are anchovies, sardine, round herring,  and so on, though anchovy is more common.

The translation of Niboshi is often confused among Japanese speaker whether sardine or anchovy because in Japanese, both sardine and anchovy are called in one name "iwashi"(イワシ). The word niboshi 煮干し literally means "boiled" and "dried" and it does not include specific ingredient name. For those combined reasons niboshi is translated in both ways as "dried sardine", or "dried anchovy".

In Japan, niboshi dashi is one of the more common forms of dashi. It is especially popular as the base stock when making miso soup.  Niboshi dashi is made by soaking niboshi in plain water. If left overnight or brought nearly to a boil, the flavor of niboshi permeates the water to make the stock.

Niboshi are also cooked and served as snacks and as one of the symbolic foods making up the Japanese osechi during New Year. Tazukuri (fried sweet and savory sardines) are made by frying the dried sardines and then adding a mixture of soy sauce, sugar, mirin, and roasted white sesame seeds.

See also
Japanese cuisine
Sardine
Anchovy

References

Japanese cuisine
Dried fish